Seventh Brings Return: A Tribute to Syd Barrett is a live video by Brazilian psychedelic rock band Violeta de Outono, released by Voiceprint Records in 2009. It was recorded during a show at the Teatro Popular do SESI on July 17, 2006, in which they covered numerous Pink Floyd songs as a tribute to Pink Floyd's former lead vocalist and founding member Syd Barrett, as well as a song of his 1970 solo album The Madcap Laughs.

Tracks

"Astronomy Domine"
"Arnold Layne"
"See Emily Play"
"Lucifer Sam"
"Matilda Mother"
"Flaming"
"Interstellar Overdrive"
"The Gnome"
"Chapter 24"
"The Scarecrow"
"Bike"
"Jugband Blues"
"No Good Trying"
"Set the Controls for the Heart of the Sun" (bonus track; recorded live at the Café Piu-Piu in São Paulo, on January 19, 2006)

Personnel
 Fabio Golfetti – vocals, guitar
 Cláudio Souza – drums
 Gabriel Costa – bass
 Fernando Cardoso – keyboards

2009 video albums
Live video albums
2009 live albums
Syd Barrett tribute albums
Voiceprint Records albums
Violeta de Outono albums